Chantal Chamandy (born about 1972) is a Canadian singer and entertainer based in Montreal, Quebec. She previously performed under the names Chantal Condor and Chantal.

Early life
Chamandy was born in Alexandria, Egypt. Her father was Greek and Egyptian and her mother was Lebanese-Egyptian.  The family moved to Montreal, Canada when Chamandy was six years old.  She sang in her church choir.

Career
Her first success was as part of Voggue, a disco duo she formed with Angela Songui.  In 1981, the duo released its first self-titled album, which contains the singles "Love Buzz", "Here We Are" and their most successful single, "Dancin' the Night Away". In 1980, a second album was released on Matra Records, containing the singles "I Want To Dance" and "Sunstruck Lovers". Voggue disbanded in 1990.

After Voggue, Chantal recorded as a solo act, which led to an album deal with Epic Records, and she released the album Chantal Condor the following year.  Off of the album came the singles "Marinero" (backed with "Don't You Want My Love") and "Nightmare".  She received a Juno Award nomination in 1990 for Most Promising Female Vocalist of the Year.

She dropped use of her last name, releasing Chantal, on the Columbia Records label in 1989. The single "A Little Lovin'" became  a charting single on Canada's RPM 100 Singles chart.  In 1991 she became a member of the French-Canadian dance quartet Collage and appeared on their first and only album, but soon left the group.  They then became a trio and the album was re-released without Chantal on the cover.

She did not release new material again until 2006, when she released a series of singles on her own independent label Ninemuse. She also used a number of unconventional strategies to get her name and material back into the public eye, including a marketing campaign on public transit and selling her single "Feels Like Love" for $1 a copy in the Dollarama chain of dollar stores, which resulted in the single selling over 10,000 copies and being picked up for sale in conventional record stores. She released Love Needs You in 2006 later the same year.  "Feels Like Love" received airplay on U.S. Adult Contemporary radio.

On 7 September 2007, she performed a concert in front of the Great Pyramid of Giza in Egypt in conjunction with the Cairo Symphony Orchestra. That performance was released on album and DVD in 2008 as Beladi, and was also made available for broadcast on PBS in the United States.

Chamandy has done over 15 TV commercials as well as roles in films also credited with an appearance in 2014's Hit by Lightning, which she produced, and also wrote the score and included some of her songs in the sound track.

Albums
 Chantal Condor (1986)
 Chantal (1989)
 Love Needs You (August 15, 2006)
 Beladi (2008)

Singles
 "Hands Up" (1987)
 "Marinero" (1985)
 "Nightmare" (1986)
 "A Little Lovin'" (1989)
 "Angel In Your Eyes" (1992)
 "You Want Me" (January 1, 2006)
 "Feels Like Love" (August 8, 2006)

Chantal album (1989)
List of track titles (writers) - Chantal performs lead vocals for all songs, unless noted otherwise.
"A Little Lovin'" (Brian Macleod)
"Angel in Your Eyes" (Brian Macleod)
"Don't You Want My Love" (Aldo Nova)
"Can't Dance Forever" (Ken LeRay)
"Let Me Be the One" (Peter Wood, Chantal) - Duet with Chantal and Michael Ruff
"Sometimes Love Can Heal a Broken Heart" (Peter Wood, Chantal)
"Imagination" (Ross, Bayyan)
"You've Got Potential" (Michael Jay, Alan Scott) 
"Some Kind of Magic" (M. Mangold, Aldo Nova)
"Ready or Note?" (Peter Wood, Chantal)
"Bells" (D. Allen, R. Van Hoy, M. Humpris)
Chantal was produced by Peter Wood

DVDs
 Beladi: A Night at The Pyramids (2008)

Filmography
 Discussions in Bioethics: Critical Choice (1987) (Short film)
 Miles to Go (1986) (TV movie) as Meg (as Chantal Condor)
 Wednesday's Children: Robert (1987) (Short film)
 Crazy Moon (1987) as Cleveland's Girlfriend (as Chantal Condor)
 Scanners III: The Takeover (1992) as Female Guest - one of the sequels to Scanners
 Hit By Lightning (2014) as Tracey

References

External links
 Chantal Chamandy on Virb
 Chantal Chamandy's Myspace
 Ninemuse's website

Chantal Condor at Discogs
Chantal (album) at Discogs
"Marinero / Don't You Want My Love" at Discogs
[ "Dancin' the Night Away"] at Allmusic

Year of birth missing (living people)
Living people
Canadian dance musicians
Egyptian emigrants to Canada
Singers from Montreal
People from Alexandria
Canadian women pop singers
20th-century Canadian women singers
21st-century Canadian women singers